"Further Than the Planes Fly" is a song by Australian indie-pop singer Eves Karydas. It was released on 17 January 2018 as the second single from her forthcoming debut studio album Summerskin. The single was certified gold in Australia in March 2019.

Karydas said she wrote the song shortly after moving to London and when she suddenly fell in love and the song follows the arc of that relationship "It was the first time I think I'd ever felt in love and I just remember very specific details about a certain day when I was riding the number 36 bus and then there was a sunset and a plane that streaked across the sky... as corny as it sounds."

Reception
Jessica McSweeny from The AU Review wrote: "The single feels on trend yet effortlessly fresh, with clean harmonies and a soaring soprano hook that shows off Karydas as the talented vocalist that she is. It's a summer single with a punch, delivering a catchy chorus that gets instantly stuck in your head."

Track listing
Digital download
 "Further Than the Plane Fly" – 2:58

Digital download
 "Further Than the Plane Fly" (acoustic) – 3:14

Certifications

References

2018 songs
2018 singles
Eves Karydas songs
Dew Process singles
Songs written by Eves Karydas
Songs written by Samuel Dixon